Harold Osborne Kirton (4 January 1894 – 9 May 1974) was an English cricketer. Kirton was a right-handed batsman who bowled right-arm medium pace. He was born at Paddington, London.

Kirton made two first-class appearances for Warwickshire, four years apart from one another. The first came in the 1925 County Championship against Surrey at Edgbaston, while the second came in the 1929 County Championship against Middlesex at Lord's. Kirton scored a total of 82 runs in his two matches, top scoring with 52 against Middlesex.

He died at Holland-on-Sea, Essex on 9 May 1974.

References

External links
Harold Kirton at ESPNcricinfo
Harold Kirton at CricketArchive

1894 births
1974 deaths
People from Paddington
English cricketers
Warwickshire cricketers